Malik Ata Muhammad Khan (Urdu, 25 October 1937 – 6 February 2020), popularly known as Prince Malik Ata was a Pakistani feudal lord and politician. He was the chief of Kot Fateh Khan in Attock District of North Western Punjab, Pakistan. He was also a member of the Punjab Assembly between 1990 and 1993.

Malik Ata was known for his equestrian hobbies. He was the first elected President of the Equestrian & Tent Pegging Federation of Pakistan. He was well known in Pakistan for his attempts to promote tentpegging and bull races. He was one of the founders of the International Tent Pegging Federation which is recognised by the FEI. He was the Vice-President of International Tent Pegging Federation.

History
He was the Maternal Grandson of Sir Sardar Muhammad Nawaz Khan Gheba who was the chief of The Gheba-Rajput tribe and of Kot Fateh estate compromising 84 villages conquered by his predecessor nearly 100 years ago. He was made The head of the family by his maternal grandfather Sardar Muhammad Nawaz khan Gheba because the Sardar did not have any male child and thus Malik ata being his eldest grandson was given the responsibility. He was the son of Malik Yar Muhammad Khan who was married to the eldest daughter of Sardar Muhammad Nawaz khan Gheba.He Belonged to the Jodhra Rajput clan and was actually descended from a younger brother of the Nawab of Pindigheb who was the chief of the  Jodhra Rajput clan. He was son in law of Nawab Malik Ameer Muhammad Khan Awan (Nawab Of Kalabagh), ex Governor of West Pakistan.

Political career 
In 1988, he contested election on the Islami Jamhoori Ittihad (IJI) platform Thereafter in 1990, Malik Ata Muhammad Khan again contested the election from his home constituency (PP-15 – Attock) and was elected and served the provincial assembly of the Punjab from 5 November 1990 to 28 June 1993.
After his father's death in 1996, he assumed the responsibilities of the family and management of the estate, hence why he was unable to continue his work in politics.

Participation in international events

Malik Ata has taken part in tent pegging and other equestrian championships in Europe, South Africa, Australia, the United States and India.

In 1982, Ata participated in the Ninth Asian Games held in Delhi, winning the silver medal for Pakistan.
Ata with Pakistan team took part in 1982 Hyde Park games in London.
Ata led Pakistan tent pegging team at the annual Royal Adelaide Show 2010 held in Adelaide, South Australia.
Ata led the Pakistan team in the Penta Grand World Equestrian Tent Pegging Championship in 2010, 2012 and 2013.

Ata was invited by the FEI to give a demonstration of tent pegging at the 2014 FEI World Equestrian Games held in Normandy, France. On the opening day he was honoured to lead all the countries of the world with the Pakistani flag held.
An international tent pegging competition was held in February 2013 at University of Agriculture, Faisalabad. This was the first time more than two international teams visited Pakistan to participate in an international event, with the competitors being England, Pakistan, South Africa and a United Nations team. The teams were invited by Malik Ata who was the chief organiser.

International Tent Pegging Federation 
In his preliminary address at the 2013 World Equestrian Tent Pegging Championship held in Gurgaon, India, Ata expressed the desire for a world organisation to address the FEI. The participants created the World Tent Pegging Federation, of which Ata was elected honorary president. At the second World Tent Pegging Federation Meeting held in Oman on 27 October 2013, Ata was elected a member of the Executive Committee to serve for four years.

Media appearances 
He was mentioned in BBC series Michael Palin's Himalaya production. Michael Palin during his trip to South Asia visited Malik Ata's home town. He witnessed some traditional activities and bulls race event there.

He was the subject of a short documentary produced by the BBC entitled "One Man and his Horse" in 1983.

Malik Ata was also subject of a documentary "Malik Ata and his love for the traditional sports". It was presented by Trans World Sport Channel with the co operation of BBC. Producer Sophia Swire along with her team visited traditional bulls at Kot Fateh Khan.

He also appeared in PTV's 1998 drama Alpha Bravo Charlie produced by ISPR and directed by Pakistani drama and film director Shoaib Mansoor.

He appeared in the movie "Verna", played the role of a governor (released on 17 November 2017). Many scenes have been shot in his haveli at Kot Fateh Khan.

Photo gallery

References 

1937 births
2020 deaths
Asian Games competitors for Pakistan
Equestrians at the 1982 Asian Games
Pakistani landowners
Pakistani male equestrians
People from Attock District
Punjab MPAs 1990–1993
Punjabi people
Aitchison College alumni
Forman Christian College alumni